Haliotoidea is a superfamily of sea snails, marine gastropod mollusks in the subclass Vetigastropoda (according to the taxonomy of the Gastropoda by Bouchet & Rocroi, 2005).

Families 
The superfamily Haliotoidea contains (according to the taxonomy of the Gastropoda by Bouchet & Rocroi, 2005) two families:
 The recent family Haliotidae, also known as abalones
 The extinct family Temnotropidae.

References

Vetigastropoda
Taxa named by Constantine Samuel Rafinesque